John Landells (11 November 1904 – 1986) was an English footballer who played as a forward.

Born in Gateshead, County Durham, Landells played for Grays Athletic, Millwall, West Ham United, Bristol City, Carlisle United, Walsall, Clapton Orient and Chelmsford City. He signed for Millwall from amateur Essex club Grays Athletic . He played eight years for Millwall, from 1925 to 1933 where he scored a total of 71 goals in 184 appearances in all competitions. He is Millwall's eighth all-time leading scorer. He played for the "Professionals" in the 1929 FA Charity Shield. He left in the summer of 1933 to join their rivals West Ham. He only played with them for a season, scoring four goals in 22 games. He left to join Bristol City, where he enjoyed FA Cup giant killing success in his first season, when they knocked Portsmouth out in the Fourth Round.

References

1904 births
1960 deaths
Footballers from Gateshead
English footballers
Association football forwards
Grays Athletic F.C. players
Millwall F.C. players
West Ham United F.C. players
Bristol City F.C. players
English Football League players
Carlisle United F.C. players
Walsall F.C. players
Leyton Orient F.C. players
Chelmsford City F.C. players